Gäle Virgin Forest Nature Reserve is a nature reserve in Jämtland County in Sweden.

The nature reserve protects an area of surviving old-growth forest dominated by spruce in a landscape otherwise heavily forested. Trees up to 300 years old grow in the reserve. The unspoilt forest with its coarse woody debris provides a habitat for several red listed or unusual species such as Schismatomma pericleum, Chaenothecopsis viridialba, Haploporus odorus and Anomoporia bombycina.

References

Nature reserves in Sweden
Tourist attractions in Jämtland County
Geography of Jämtland County
Protected areas established in 2005
2005 establishments in Sweden
Old-growth forests